The Cornish Pirates are a professional rugby union team who play in the Championship, the second level of the English rugby union pyramid, and are the premier Cornish rugby club. Formerly known as Penzance & Newlyn RFU, the Cornish Pirates play and train at their home ground, the Mennaye Field in Penzance.

History
At the end of the 2004–05 season the Pirates finished in 4th position in National Division 1 which at the time was their highest league position since owner Dicky Evans became president and just three places below Premiership rugby status.

In 2005 the Pirates moved away from their home at The Mennaye in Penzance, first to Kenwyn Rugby Ground, near Truro, and then to Camborne Recreation Ground. In examining the options it had been viewed as imperative to increase the support base which led to a difficult decision for Dicky Evans and the supporters of the Pirates, as to whether the team should relocate to another site to play their home matches or not.  The questions, concerns and sentiments arising from the proposals were thoroughly debated in the clubhouse and elsewhere. However, on 27 May 2005 at an emergency meeting held in a packed St Johns Hall the innovative plans were passed. They included:

 Relocating to a new temporary site at Kenwyn, Truro for the 2005–06 season.
 Re-branding including changing the club's name to the Cornish Pirates.
 Upgrading all the facilities at the Mennaye Field which will continue to act as the permanent training base for the Cornish Pirates.
 The Mennaye to continue to act as the playing home for the Pirates mini and junior sections and Mounts Bay RFC.

Following the vote, Dicky Evans told members: "ten years ago I asked you to support me in taking this club into the professional era. At that time there were those were totally against this move, there are people that are against this latest move. However, it is my belief that we must try this venture". He expressed his personal happiness at the support expressed for the move and regarded it as a step towards a Premiership rugby club in Cornwall.

Following a highly successful 2005–06 season, (when crowds were increased and the Pirates finished 3rd in Division 1), it was decided to relocate again and over the next two seasons the Cornish Pirates played their home rugby matches at Camborne RFC's recreation ground. Camborne's ground is seen as many to be the best rugby ground in Cornwall boasting a superb grandstand. On 15 April 2007, the Cornish Pirates won the EDF Energy National Trophy at Twickenham for the first time in the club's history, against Exeter Chiefs. The score was 19–16.

The Pirates returned to The Mennaye for the 2010–11 season and remain there to date.

After the success of the 2006–07 cup win, the hope was that the club's ambition could finally be realised. This hope was hampered by the loss of Viliami Ma'asi and Alberto Di Bernardo (to Leeds), these losses were offset in some degree by the signing of Canadian international scrum half Ed Fairhurst, former England U21 centre Simon Whatling from Worcester and seasoned professional Rob Elloway from Gloucester. At first the results were not good but after the World Cup the team began to pick up and were joined by one of the stars of the tournament Tongan full back; Vunga Lilo. Unfortunately the side couldn't live with the newly relegated Northampton Saints and were unlucky to draw them in the 1st round of the cup, going down 15–3 at home.

In 2009–10 the Pirates won the inaugural British and Irish Cup, beating Munster A 23–14 in the final at the Recreation Ground, Camborne.

Pirates remain a solid RFU Championship side, their lowest finish since being 9th in 2015–16, with highs of 3rd in 2010–11 and 2011–12. These 3rd-place finishes resulted in Pirates qualifying for the promotion play-offs. In 2010-11 Pirates beat London Welsh in the semi-final 18–10 at the Mennaye Field before succumbing to Worcester Warriors in the final over two legs, 12–21 at home and 25–20 away, 46–32 on aggregate, resulting in Worcester's promotion back to the Aviva Premiership. The following season the Pirates again won their semi-final, beating Bristol over two legs, 45–24 at home and losing 29–18 away, resulting in a 63–53 win on aggregate. Pirates again however lost in the final, this time to London Welsh, losing 21–37 at the Mennaye and 29–20 away from home, 66–41 on aggregate.

Following these highs, Pirates did not finish in the play-off places again, finishing between 6th and 9th in the subsequent seasons. They returned to the top four in the 2017–18 season, finishing 4th, however a restructure to the league for that season had seen the play-offs abolished, with 1st place being promoted to the Premiership automatically.

To be promoted to the Premiership a team must meet certain stadium requirements, and the capacity of the Mennaye Field is too small to meet these. Because of this, there have been many plans over the years for the Pirates to move into a new, larger stadium which meets these requirements to allow the Pirates to achieve their goal of promotion to the Premiership. The most concrete of these plans is the proposed Stadium for Cornwall, which would be home for both the Pirates and Truro City Football Club. The Stadium For Cornwall has received funding from Cornwall Council, and is now only awaiting £3m of funding from the UK government before construction can begin, which is expected to be provided in Spring 2019. The first stage is planned to have a capacity of 6,000, which can be expanded to 10,000 in phase two in the event of the Pirates being promoted.

Supporters
A number of promotions at the beginning of the 21st century saw the Pirates rise from south-west regional rugby all of the way up to the second division. The re-brand from Penzance & Newlyn to the Cornish Pirates for the 2005–06 season, along with relocating from Penzance to Truro, meant that the club was not only the highest ranked in the county but also the best supported, having doubled its supporter base in just over five seasons. A further move to Camborne the next season saw attendances continued to flourish, rising to a peak of 3,011 per game during the 2009–10 season.

A move back to Penzance during the 2010–11 season heralded a steady decline in attendances, although as the county's only professional team the club still was easily the best supported. Despite their higher status, the Pirates continued to enjoy good relations with neighbouring clubs such as Redruth and Camborne, often playing home matches on Sunday so that supporters of those clubs can also attend games at the Mennaye Field. It is hoped that the proposed move back to Truro to the proposed Stadium for Cornwall will see an upturn in the club's fortunes and bring the supporters back.

Season summary

Honours
 Cornwall Cup winners (3): 1975–76, 1998–99, 1999–00 
 Cornwall & Devon champions: 1989–90
 South West Division 2 champions: 1996–97
 South West Division 1 champions: 1998–99
 National League 3 South champions: 2001–02
 National League 2 champions: 2002–03
 EDF Energy National Trophy winners: 2006–07
 British and Irish Cup winners: 2009–10
 RFU Championship runners up: 2010–11, 2011–12

Club records
Highest attendance – 6,487 
At home to Northampton Saints on 9 September 2007 (Recreation Ground, Camborne).
Highest average attendance (league) — 3,486	
Achieved during the 2007–08 season

Current standings

Current squad

The Cornish Pirates squad for the 2022–23 season.

Notable former players

  Joe Bearman
  Stack Stevens
  Rob Thirlby
  Will James
  Blair Cowan'''
  Dave Ward
  Bertie Hopkin
  Oscar Osir

Notes

See also

 2018–19 RFU Championship
 2018–19 RFU Championship Cup
 Cornwall RFU
 Newlyn RFC
 Penzance RFC

References

External links
Official site
Unofficial Fans site & Forum
Camborne RFC 
Trelawny's Army
London Cornish RFC – for those living in London missing Cornish Rugby!
Cornish Pirates on itsrugby.co.uk

 
Cornish rugby union teams
Rugby clubs established in 1945
1945 establishments in England
Sports clubs in Cornwall